Don't Say may refer to:

"Don't Say" (Jon B. song),  1997
"Don't Say" (William Wei song), 2015
"Don't Say" (The Chainsmokers song), 2017
"Don't Say", a 2007 song by Laura Critchley